Chris Kent is the name of:

 Alf Kjellin (1920–1988), Swedish film actor and director who also used the name Christopher Kent
 Christopher Corey Smith, voice actor also known as Chris Kent
 Christopher Kent (cricketer) (born 1991), Papua New Guinean cricketer
 Stephen Clarke (writer) (born 1958), real name Chris Kent, British journalist and novelist
 Chris Kent (character), Kryptonian boy featured in the comic book Action Comics